Gertrude-Olisava (c. 1025 – 4 January 1108), was Grand Princess consort of Rus' by marriage to Iziaslav I of Kiev. 
She was the daughter of King Mieszko II of Poland and Queen Richeza of Lotharingia, and the great-granddaughter of German Emperor Otto II.

Early life 
The exact time and place of Gertude's birth is unknown, with most sources placing it around 1025. It is estimated she  stayed in Poland until 1036, then left for Germany with her mother, returning when Casimir I the Restorer, Gertrude's brother established himself as Duke of Poland.

In her early life, she received a thorough education, first, in Poland, then presumably in one of the Abbeys located in the province of Cologne.

Grand Princess 

In 1043, Gertrude married Iziaslav I of Kiev, a son of Yaroslav the Wise. 

She had two sons, Yaropolk Iziaslavich and Mstislav, and a daughter, Eupraxia, who later married the Prince of Kraków, Mieszko Bolesławowic of the Piast dynasty. Often acknowledged as her son, Sviatopolk II of Kiev may have been a son of Izyaslav and a concubine.

On 15 September 1068 Iziaslav suffered a defeat and both she and her husband were expelled from Kiev and settled in Poland. It was then that Gertrude inherited a medieval illuminated manuscript, known as the Egbert Psalter or Trier Psalter, which had been created in the late 10th century for archbishop Egbert of Trier. She included her prayer book as part of the codex. In the prayer book she prays six times for Yaropolk, unicus filius meus (translated as either "my favourite son" or "my only son").

On 2 May 1069 Bolesław II the Generous, Gertrude's nephew, helped Izjasław regain control of Kiev. Though on 22 March 1073, the princely couple with their children had to flee to Poland again. This time Bolesław had sided with the Ruthenian opposition, and forced the family to leave for Germany. However, he himself was forced by the pope to reconcile with the couple, which was to be a condition for granting him the royal crown. On 25 December 1076, Gertrude and her husband took part in the coronation of Bolesław in Gniezno .

On 15 July 1077 the couple settled, once again, in Kiev.

Later life
After her husband's death in 1078, Gertrude stayed at the court of the youngest son of Yaropolk, the Duke of Turów and Włodzimierz . In 1084 she became a hostage of Vladimir II Monomakh, who had captured Lutsk, where she had taken refuge, abandoned by her son.

She died on 4 January 1108. The place of her burial is unknown.

Footnotes 

1020s births
1108 deaths
11th-century Polish people
Kievan Rus' princesses
Ottonian dynasty
Polish princesses
Polish astrologers
Piast dynasty
11th-century Rus' people
11th-century Rus' women
11th-century Polish women